Jason Victor Cundy (born 12 November 1969) is an English former professional footballer and radio broadcaster for talkSPORT.

As a player, he was a defender, who notably played in the Premier League for Chelsea and Tottenham Hotspur. He also played in the Football League for Crystal Palace, Bristol City, Ipswich Town and Portsmouth. He was capped three times by England U21, scoring once.

Since retirement he has worked as a  broadcaster. He presents The Sports Bar on talkSPORT, Jason Cundy Kicks Off on London Live as well as commentating and presenting for Chelsea TV. Cundy was also the co-founder of the classic section of the Sports Bar "Turnip of the Week".

Playing career
During his career, Cundy played for Chelsea (1988–92, 41 league appearances), Tottenham Hotspur (loan in 1992, 1992 – November 96, with 28 games), Crystal Palace (one month-loan, 1995), Bristol City (another 30-day loan, 1996), Ipswich Town (after a loan, November 1996–99) and Portsmouth. 

Cundy is remembered for the "freak" goal that he scored against Ipswich Town in a Premiership match for Tottenham, in 1992–93. In an attempt to kick the ball 40 yards from goal, he slipped and managed a wind-assisted effort that ended up flying over 'keeper Craig Forrest and into the back of the net. The goal was captured live on Sky Sports and put Spurs 1–0 up, in a match that finished 1–1.
 
Cundy was forced to retire in 2000 due to a knee injury, and subsequently became a presenter on talkSPORT, regularly appearing with Ian Danter and Alvin Martin on Football First. He also occasionally co-hosted Evening Kick-Off, subbing in for any regular member, while appearing regularly as a presenter/pundit on Chelsea TV. He currently co-hosts Andy Goldstein's Sports Bar with Andy Goldstein and Jamie O'Hara on weeknights. Cundy is popular for nightly feature 'Wheel Of Cundy' in which he tells a story about a sometimes named and sometimes anonymous footballer he has played with throughout his career.

Media career
Cundy presents The Sports Bar on talkSPORT, Jason Cundy Kicks Off on London Live as well as commentating and presenting for Chelsea TV. Cundy was also the co-founder of the classic section of the Sports Bar "Turnip of the Week".

On Saturday, 18 October  2008, Cundy went on holiday and was unavailable to do TalkSport show, and TalkSport radio DJ Andy Goldstein erroneously reported that he had died after falling off a boat and  drowning. The report, which Goldstein later admitted was meant as a joke, resulted in several fans of Chelsea Football Club putting down flowers outside Stamford Bridge the following day.

In 2011, Cundy made a brief appearance on Michael Bublé: Home for Christmas, a Christmas programme presented by Canadian singer Michael Bublé.

Personal life
In 1994 he married Lizzie Miller and they had a son.

In February 1997, just after his transfer to Ipswich Town, he was diagnosed with testicular cancer and had surgery the following day to remove a testicle. It had been announced that he was absent from the team due to a shin injury. Despite the cancer, in May 2000 he and Lizzie had a second son. He separated from Lizzie in 2010, and they divorced in December 2012.

In June 2015, Cundy married Hannah Pedley, a mezzo-soprano, and their union produced a son.

Cundy helped start the Cancer Campaign in Suffolk and raised thousand of pounds for cancer charities and awareness of the disease. Cundy has also spoken out in support of the charity Act Against Bullying.

References

1969 births
Living people
English footballers
Footballers from Wandsworth
Association football defenders
Premier League players
Chelsea F.C. players
Tottenham Hotspur F.C. players
Crystal Palace F.C. players
Bristol City F.C. players
Ipswich Town F.C. players
Portsmouth F.C. players
Sydney Olympic FC players
England under-21 international footballers
English sports broadcasters